Swedish colonisation of Finland happened during the Northern Crusades from the 12th century until the 1350s. Colonisation focused on the Finnish archipelago and some of its coastal regions. The colonisation  led to the beginning of the Swedish-speaking population of Finland. The settlers were from central Sweden. It has been estimated that there were thousands of settlers.

History
The reason behind the colonisation was the pursuit of the Roman Catholic Church to spread its faith to pagan lands around the Baltic Sea. The settlers were Christians and they arrived to lands that were still in major parts under Finnish paganism. Besides the Catholic Church, the colonisation was supported by the still primal Swedish Kingdom who granted four years of tax exemption to any Christian Swede who settled the areas of Southwest Finland, Uusimaa, Åland, Tavastia or Satakunta.

The colonisation was also affected by the favorable climate phase in Europe. The warm climate phase of 980–1250 had led to population growth, which led to the need for emigration. At the same time Swedes also emigrated to northern Sweden and western Estonia (see Estonian Swedes). In the 14th century Swedes also colonised Medelpad and Ångermanland.

Besides the violence of the crusades, the colonisation led to several conflicts between the settlers and Finns. The settlers needed support from Sweden in many areas against the Finns. The native inhabitants in many coastal areas also lost their fishing and farming rights, which led to conflicts. In 1348, Hemming of Turku, Bishop of Turku and the head of the Turku Castle, gave a letter of protection to the settlers in the area of the Gulf of Bothnia. As a result of the colonisation, some of the pagan inhabitants who refused to receive the new Catholic religion from Tavastia and Satakunta started to move to the northern parts of Finland.

See also
Finland under Swedish rule
First Swedish Crusade
Second Swedish Crusade
Third Swedish Crusade

References 

Northern Crusades
Medieval Finland
Medieval Sweden